is a Tōshō-gū Shinto shrine located in the Taitō ward of Tokyo, Japan.

First established in 1627 by Tōdō Takatora and renovated in 1651 by Tokugawa Iemitsu, the shrine has remained mostly intact since that time, making it a great example of Shinto architecture in the Edo period. Several of those surviving structures have been designated Important Cultural Properties.

Tōshō-gū shrines are characterized by enshrining Tokugawa Ieyasu with the name Tōshō Daigongen (東照大権現). Ueno Tōshō-gū also enshrines two other Tokugawa shōguns, Tokugawa Yoshimune and Tokugawa Yoshinobu.

Located inside of Ueno Park, Ueno Tōshō-gū has become a popular attraction.

History 

Ueno Tōshō-gū is said to have been built in 1627, by Tōdō Takatora. It is known that in 1627 it was dedicated to the memory of Tokugawa Ieyasu (1542–1616), the founder and first shōgun of the Tokugawa shogunate of Japan, which effectively ruled Japan from the Battle of Sekigahara in 1600 until the Meiji Restoration in 1868.

In 1651 the honden of the shrine was rebuilt in the gongen-zukuri style by Tokugawa Iemitsu (1604–1651), grandson of Ieyasu and the third Tokugawa shōgun.

Until 1868, the shrine was part of the Tendai Buddhist temple Kan'ei-ji.

Unlike many of the buildings in the surrounding area, Ueno Tōshō-gū has remained intact throughout the numerous earthquakes, fires and wars, including the Battle of Ueno in 1868 and the Great Kantō earthquake in 1923.

Tokugawa Yoshimune (1684–1751) and Tokugawa Yoshinobu (1837–1913) are also enshrined in Ueno Tōshō-gū.

Architecture

Karamon 

The karamon at Ueno Tōshō-gū was built in 1651, and it is designated an Important Cultural Property.

The pillars of the gate are decorated with two carved dragons. There carvings are attributed to the perhaps fictiona artist . Jingorō is also credited with some of the decoration at the famous Nikkō Tōshō-gū in Nikkō, Tochigi Prefecture.

In addition to the gold foil, there are several hand carved decorations, including flowers, birds and dragons on both sides of the gates. It is said that the carvings on the gate and on the  wall depict a total of over two hundred species of plants and animals.

Honden 

The whole building dates from 1651, and it is designated an Important Cultural Property.

Access 

There is no admission fee for visitors to enter most of the shrine precincts, but there is a  fee (500 yen) in order to go beyond the karamon. This allows you see the back of the karamon and to get closer to the honden, but the hall itself remains closed. There is an extra admission fee (700 yen) to enter the peony garden.

The shrines opens at 9 am and closes at 4:30 pm (from October to February) or 5:30 pm (from March to September). The peony garden is open from January 1st to mid-February, and from mid-April to mid-May.

Ueno Tōshō-gū can be accessed via the following public transport options:
        Ueno Station
  Keisei Ueno Station
  Nezu Station

References

External links 

Ueno Tōshō-gū Official website

1627 establishments in Japan
Shinto shrines in Tokyo
Buildings and structures in Taitō
Ueno Park
Important Cultural Properties of Japan
Religious buildings and structures completed in 1651
Tōshō-gū